Brenthis mofidii, the Mofidi's fritillary, is a butterfly in the family Nymphalidae. It was described by Wyatt in 1969.

Subspecies
Brenthis mofidii mofidii
Brenthis mofidii zabensis Leestmans & Carbonell, 1993 (Turkey)

References

Butterflies described in 1969
Argynnini